The 1976 New York Yankees season was the 74th season for the Yankees. The team finished with a record of 97–62, finishing 10½ games ahead of the Baltimore Orioles to win their first American League East Division title.

In the ALCS, the Yankees defeated the Kansas City Royals in 5 games. Chris Chambliss's walk-off home run in Game 5 clinched the pennant for the Yankees.

In the World Series, they were defeated in a four-game sweep by the defending champion Cincinnati Reds, marking only the second time that the Yankees had ever been swept in a World Series in their history (following the 1963 Los Angeles Dodgers).

New York was managed by Billy Martin. The Yankees returned to the newly renovated Yankee Stadium.

Offseason 
The Yankees returned to their home stadium in The Bronx after a two-year absence. The team had played home games at Shea Stadium in Queens, the home of the New York Mets, while renovations to Yankee Stadium were completed.

The 1975 club had finished in third place in the AL East with a record of 83–77, finishing 12 games behind the division winning Boston Red Sox. The club was beginning their first full season under manager Billy Martin, who had been hired following the mid-season firing of Bill Virdon.

Owner George Steinbrenner made three off-season moves to try to help the club. First, they brought in power-hitting outfielder/DH Oscar Gamble, who would find the 'short porch' in right field very inviting for his power swing.  Then the club made two deals on the same day: they sent Doc Medich to Pittsburgh for three players, primarily seeking the services of pitcher Dock Ellis; and shipping outfielder Bobby Bonds to California for leadoff man Mickey Rivers and starter Ed Figueroa. The Pirates trade had the longest lasting impact, as then-unheralded minor leaguer Willie Randolph was included in the deal, and was a major catalyst on championship teams for years to come.

Notable transactions 
 November 22, 1975: Pat Dobson was traded by the Yankees to the Cleveland Indians for Oscar Gamble.
 December 11, 1975: Doc Medich was traded by the Yankees to the Pittsburgh Pirates for Dock Ellis, Ken Brett and Willie Randolph.
 December 11, 1975: Bobby Bonds was traded by the Yankees to the California Angels for Mickey Rivers and Ed Figueroa.
 January 27, 1976: Walt Williams was released by the Yankees.
 March 29, 1976: Ed Brinkman was released by the Yankees.

Regular season

Season standings

Record vs. opponents

Season summary 
The Yankees won 97 games in 1976 and captured the Eastern Division title of the American League, marking their first postseason appearance since 1964. Two monumental things happened as the season opened. First, the club returned to Yankee Stadium to play home games, with a special pre-game ceremony for the April 15 home opener that included Joe DiMaggio, Mickey Mantle, Whitey Ford, Don Larsen, and the widows of Babe Ruth and Lou Gehrig. Eighty-five-year-old Bob Shawkey, who had pitched in the stadium in its opening season of 1923, threw out the first pitch, and the Bronx Bombers defeated Minnesota 11–4. Second, the team announced that Thurman Munson would serve in the role of team captain. This was significant because no Yankee player had been captain since the death of Gehrig in 1941.

The team started fast with a 10–3 record in April, including a 5–1 West Coast swing through California and Oakland. On May 20, they authored another memorable chapter in their on-going rivalry with the Boston Red Sox. Lou Piniella collided with Carlton Fisk at home plate, igniting a huge bench-clearing brawl during which Graig Nettles injured Bill Lee's pitching arm.

By mid-June, the club had built a 7-game lead. On the June 15 trading deadline, they made two significant moves to secure post-season success. First, they completed a 10-player deal with Baltimore, upgrading the pitching staff by acquiring starters Ken Holtzman and Doyle Alexander. Second, they were sold the rights to all-star pitcher Vida Blue from Oakland for $1.5 million. However, Commissioner Bowie Kuhn, invoking the "best interests in baseball clause", invalidated the sale of Blue, returning him to Oakland.

In July, six players represented the team in the All-Star Game in Philadelphia: Thurman Munson, who was elected to start by the fans; Chris Chambliss; Catfish Hunter; Willie Randolph; Mickey Rivers; and Sparky Lyle. By the end of the month, their lead in the division ballooned to 14½ games. In August, they continued to cruise towards the division title, and took part in a marathon 19-inning affair with Minnesota. By September, the club was poised to secure the spot in the American League Championship Series, and did so on September 25 by defeating the Detroit Tigers 10–6 to clinch the division title.

Monument Park 

The Yankees opened "Monument Park" at the stadium in 1976. The origin of Monument Park is dated back to May 30, 1932, when the Yankees dedicated a monument to former manager Miller Huggins. The monument was placed it in front of the flagpole in center field at Yankee Stadium. Huggins was the first of many Yankees players granted this honor.

Postseason

The Yankees ended the season with a 97–62 record, best in the American League and third best overall in all of major league baseball. In the ALCS, they beat the Kansas City Royals in 5 games. In Game 5, Chris Chambliss hit a memorable walk off home run to clinch the pennant for the Yankees, sending them to the World Series for the first time since 1964. The most memorable moment about the home run was the fans coming onto the field and mobbing Chambliss, and in the process, stealing bases to keep as souvenirs. A rule was later put into place to prevent fans from coming onto the field of play during a home run, dubbed the Chris Chambliss rule. Like their arch-rivals the Red Sox did in the 1975 World Series, the Yankees lost the World Series to the dominant Cincinnati Reds. However, this World Series was much more lopsided than the previous one, as the Yankees were swept, 4 games to 0, by the Reds and were outscored 22–8 in the process.

Aftermath 
The 1976 Yankees saw the team restore the franchise to glory following the mismanaged years when CBS owned the club and failed to finish in the top half of the league or division from 1965 through 1972. Owner George Steinbrenner delivered on his promise to return the Yankees to greatness, and the fans responded as attendance reached over 2 million for the first time since 1950. Munson won the American League MVP, hitting .302 with 105 RBI. Munson became the first, and to date the only, Yankee player ever to win the MVP and the Rookie of the Year award while wearing the Yankees uniform.

However, the loss to Cincinnati in the World Series only consumed Steinbrenner to try to further improve the ball club. Thanks to the Seitz decision which made the reserve clause obsolete, Steinbrenner took advantage of the new era of free agency. In an era where other owners such as Charlie Finley were unwilling to spend money to keep players, and other clubs were still run by families not ready for the 'balance sheet' era of sports ownership, Steinbrenner ushered in the big salary era of sports by signing Reggie Jackson to a five-year contract worth just under $3 million. The idea of bringing in Jackson for 1977 would be to try to put the Yankees over the top.

Still, the 1976 version of the Yankees marked a return of prominence to the organization. It marked the first of three consecutive American League titles, and a stretch of six seasons where the club won five division titles, four league championships, and two World Series titles.

Notable transactions 
 May 16, 1976: Larry Gura was traded by the Yankees to the Kansas City Royals for Fran Healy.
 June 8, 1976: Pat Tabler was drafted by the New York Yankees in the 1st round (16th pick) of the 1976 Major League Baseball draft.
 June 15, 1976: Rudy May, Tippy Martinez, Dave Pagan, Scott McGregor, and Rick Dempsey were traded by the Yankees to the Baltimore Orioles for Ken Holtzman, Doyle Alexander, Grant Jackson, Ellie Hendricks, and Jimmy Freeman.
 July 10, 1976: The Yankees obtained Gene Locklear from the San Diego Padres for a player to be named later. The Yankees completed the deal by sending Rick Sawyer to the Padres on July 31.
 August 1, 1976: Jim York was released by the Yankees.
 August 31, 1976: Rafael Santana was signed as an amateur free agent by the Yankees.
 September 1, 1976: César Tovar was signed as a free agent by the Yankees.

Roster

Player stats

Batting

Starters by position 
Note: Pos = Position; G = Games played; AB = At bats; H = Hits; Avg. = Batting average; HR = Home runs; RBI = Runs batted in

Other batters 
Note: G = Games played; AB = At bats; H = Hits; Avg. = Batting average; HR = Home runs; RBI = Runs batted in

Pitching

Starting pitchers 
Note: G = Games pitched; IP = Innings pitched; W = Wins; L = Losses; ERA = Earned run average; SO = Strikeouts

Other pitchers 
Note: G = Games pitched; IP = Innings pitched; W = Wins; L = Losses; ERA = Earned run average; SO = Strikeouts

Relief pitchers 
Note: G = Games pitched; IP = Innings pitched; W = Wins; L = Losses; SV = Saves; ERA = Earned run average; SO = Strikeouts

Postseason

ALCS 

After splitting the first two games with the Western Division champion Royals in Kansas City, the Yankees returned home to try to capture the pennant. The two clubs split the next two games as well, setting up a deciding Game Five showdown. The Yankees had a 6–3 lead after seven innings, but the Royals rallied for 3 runs in the top of the 8th to tie the game at 6–6. Then in the bottom of the ninth, Chris Chambliss hit the first pitch thrown by Mark Littell over the right field wall for the game-winning walk-off home run.  Of course, it was anything but a walk-off, as fans stormed the field with delight, making it nearly impossible for Chambliss to round the bases. The win put the Bombers into the World Series for the first time since 1964.

Game 1 
October 9, 1976, at Royals Stadium

Game 2 
October 10, 1976, at Royals Stadium

Game 3 
October 12, 1976, at Yankee Stadium

Game 4 
October 13, 1976, at Yankee Stadium

Game 5 
October 14, 1976, at Yankee Stadium

World Series 

The Yankees were confident heading into the Fall Classic, but proved to be little match for their opponents. The Cincinnati Reds were the defending world champions, and were making their fourth World Series appearance over a seven-year span. The Big Red Machine dominated the series, sweeping the Yankees in four straight games.

Awards and honors 
Team captain Thurman Munson won the AL MVP.

Graig Nettles was the AL home run champion with 32 home runs in the season.

Munson, Chris Chambliss, Catfish Hunter, Sparky Lyle, Willie Randolph and Mickey Rivers all represented the Yankees at the 1976 Major League Baseball All-Star Game.

 Billy Martin, Associated Press AL Manager of the Year

Farm system 

LEAGUE CHAMPIONS: Syracuse, West Haven

Notes

References 
1976 New York Yankees at Baseball Reference
1976 World Series
1976 New York Yankees at Baseball Almanac

New York Yankees seasons
New York Yankees
New York Yankees
1970s in the Bronx
American League East champion seasons
American League champion seasons